The Mankato MoonDogs are an amateur baseball team that plays in the Northwoods League, a collegiate summer baseball league. Their home games are played at ISG Field in Mankato, Minnesota. The MoonDogs have been active in the Mankato community with frequent player and mascot appearances at local events and through the MoonDogs Fit Program.

History 
The team started play in 1999 as the Mankato Mashers and were renamed in 2002 when the franchise was acquired by Joe Schwei. The Moondogs were again sold in January 2013 to Mark Ogren. The current ownership group of Chad Superenant and Kyle Smith took over the club in 2018.

From 2008 to 2018 the MoonDogs made the playoffs eight of eleven season, making it to the NWL Summer Collegiate World Series on three occasions. In 2014 the MoonDogs were defeated by the Lakeshore Chinooks in a two-game series sweep.

Season-by-season

Notable alumni (played in MLB)

MoonDogs in the Minor Leagues

Staff
The team's General Manager, Tyler Kuch, is a native of Mankato, Minnesota, Walker Regier, the team's Assistant General Manager is from Southern Minnesota, he previously interned for the Willmar Stingers, another Northwoods League team.

The MoonDogs also have summer internships available for students looking for possible careers in sports. The positions include Media Relations, Promotions/Community Relations, Marketing, Sales, and Camera / Video Operations.

Muttnik
Listed at 6'3" and 210 lbs, the MoonDogs mascot throws and bats right pawed. Muttnik can be seen mingling with the crowd during games or at various community events throughout the year.

References

External links 
 Mankato MoonDogs official site

Northwoods League teams
Amateur baseball teams in Minnesota
Mankato, Minnesota